Sullivan Ridge is a massive ridge, 15 nautical miles (28 km) long, displaying a steep, irregular east slope overlooking Ramsey Glacier and a low gradient, ice-covered west slope overlooking Muck Glacier. The ridge extends generally north from Husky Heights and terminates at the confluence of Muck and Ramsey Glaciers. Discovered and photographed by U.S. Navy Operation Highjump (1946–47) and named by Advisory Committee on Antarctic Names (US-ACAN) for Walter S. Sullivan of the New York Times staff, who has written extensively on Antarctic research and exploration.

See also
Four Ramps

References

Ridges of the Ross Dependency
Dufek Coast